Raincoast Books is a Canadian book distribution and wholesale company. Based in Vancouver, British Columbia, Raincoast was founded by Mark Stanton and Allan MacDougall in 1979 as a consignment wholesaler that shared overhead, warehouse space and staff with the pair's sales agency, Stanton & MacDougall. Today, Raincoast has over 90 employees and three divisions: Raincoast Distribution, Publishers Group Canada, and BookExpress.

Divisions

Raincoast Distribution 

Raincoast Distribution is a Canadian company which provides complete sales, marketing and fulfillment services to a wide range of general trade and gift publishers from the United States, Britain and Canada. Companies distributed by Raincoast include Chronicle Books, Drawn & Quarterly, Houghton Mifflin Harcourt, Lonely Planet, New Harbinger and St. Martin's Press.

Publishers represented by Raincoast Distribution 

Beginning Press
Bilingual Books, Inc.
Bloomsbury
Chronicle Books
Creative Company
Drawn & Quarterly
Figure 1
Flatiron Books
Gibbs Smith
Hardie Grant
Houghton Mifflin Harcourt
Laurence King
Lonely Planet
Macmillan Publishers Group
Magnetic Poetry
The Mountaineers Books
New Harbinger Publications
Osprey
Page Two
Princeton Architectural Press
Quadrille
Sounds True
Sourcebooks
Raincoast Books
Tor/Forge
Twirl

Publishers Group Canada 

Publishers Group Canada (PGC) was acquired by Raincoast Books in 2000. Based in Toronto, Ontario, PGC distributes independently owned book publishing houses including Grove Atlantic, New World Library and Egmont Books in Canada.

BookExpress 

BookExpress is a wholesale division supplying Canadian bookstores and retailers. BookExpress carries bestselling books from publishers including Random House Canada, Penguin Books Canada, HarperCollins Canada, Scholastic Canada, Diamond Book Distribution and Firefly.

Raincoast Publishing 

Between 1995 and 2008, Raincoast Books was also a book publisher. The Raincoast publishing program produced a range of fiction and non-fiction titles for both adults and children. Authors who published work with Raincoast included Anne Fleming, Alison Pick, Colin McAdam, Nick Bantock, George Bowering, Paul William Roberts, Naim Kattan, Roy Miki, Amanda K. Hale, and Bill Gaston. As a publisher, the company was noted for using large amounts of recycled paper in its books. In January 2008, Raincoast announced that it would cease to publish new books due to the rise in the Canadian dollar. Raincoast also ceased to be the Canadian publisher of J.K. Rowling's Harry Potter books in 2010.

Notes

External links
 Raincoast Distribution
 Publishers Group Canada

Book publishing companies of Canada